Jean-Jacques Mandrichi (born 3 June 1984) is a French footballer who plays as a forward for Gallia Club Lucciana.

Career
Mandrichi was born in Bastia. After a successful time at AC Ajaccio Mandrichi signed a two-year deal to play for Grenoble Foot 38. After scoring 52 goals in Ligue 2, on 30 July 2011, Mandrichi moved to Ligue 2 rivals FC Nantes, signing a two-year contract. Soon after the signing, the player was openly criticised by club owner Waldemar Kita, and on 4 October 2011, FC Nantes and Jean-Jacques Mandrichi decided to terminate the contract signed in late July.

He signed a two-year contract with LB Châteauroux, but after one season, he moved to newly promoted Ligue 2 side Gazélec Ajaccio on a two-year deal.

In January 2013, Mandrichi moved to Championnat National side Red Star Saint-Ouen.

References

External links

1984 births
Living people
Sportspeople from Bastia
Association football forwards
French footballers
SC Bastia players
AC Ajaccio players
Nîmes Olympique players
Grenoble Foot 38 players
FC Nantes players
LB Châteauroux players
Gazélec Ajaccio players
CA Bastia players
USC Corte players
Red Star F.C. players
Borgo FC players
AS Cannes players
FC Istres players
Ligue 1 players
Ligue 2 players
Championnat National players
Championnat National 3 players
Corsica international footballers
Footballers from Corsica